Ronald Goedemondt (Tegelen, 1975) is a Dutch comedian and actor.

Biography 
Goedemondt was born in Tegelen in Limburg, but he moved to Eindhoven after four years. His father is Dutch, while his mother is of Italian descent. He studied the HEAO communication.

In 1999, he started with stand-up comedy. He is part of a Dutch group of stand-up comedians called Comedytrain. He won both the audience award and the jury award at the Cameretten cabaret festival in 2003. In 2013, he worked with three fellow comedians on the sketch comedy show Sluipschutters (English: snipers), which was aired by BNN for more than one season.

Programs 
 2020–current: Numero Uno
 2015–2017: Geen sprake van
 2013–2014: R van Ronald
 2011–2012: Binnen de lijntjes
 2008–2009: Dedication
 2007–2008: Ze bestaan echt 
 2004–2006: Spek

Awards 
 Cameretten 2003
 Neerlands Hoop 2008 
 Edison comedy 2009

External links 
 Official site
 

1975 births
Living people
Dutch cabaret performers
Dutch people of Italian descent
Dutch stand-up comedians
People from Tegelen